The Milwaukee Road Depot in Madison, Wisconsin is a railroad depot built in 1903 and operated by the Chicago, Milwaukee, St. Paul and Pacific Railroad (Milwaukee Road). It served numerous passenger trains, including the Sioux and Varsity, and was located next to a major yard, turntable, and roundhouse. The station was one of two Milwaukee Road stations in Madison, and was also known as West Madison station or West Madison Depot to avoid confusion with Franklin Street station on the east side of Madison. All Milwaukee Road passenger service in Madison was consolidated to this station with the closing of Franklin Street in 1952. The Milwaukee Road's service from Chicago to Minneapolis-St. Paul traveled through Milwaukee and central Wisconsin, bypassing Madison to the north. The railroad's competitor, the Chicago and North Western Railroad, offered direct service northwest to Minneapolis.

Passenger operations
In 1953 the station mainly served On Wisconsin and other trains east on a route to Watertown, Milwaukee and then to Chicago.
Additionally, the timetables showed these named trains that took at direct path to Chicago, through Janesville:
Sioux (a Chicago-Rapid City, SD night train)
Varsity (a Chicago-Madison train; it left Madison in the morning and returned from Chicago in the evening)

Eclipse of service
Rail service in Madison was terminated in 1971 when the Milwaukee Road opted to end all of its passenger operations.

Current usage 
The depot is now used as a shopping center; including a bicycle shop, a café, and a restaurant. MILW 35A, an EMD E8A locomotive, sits on static display outside of the depot along with several Milwaukee Road, New York Central Railroad, and Metropolitan Transportation Authority passenger cars. A single-tracked line operated by the Wisconsin and Southern Railroad remains in front of the depot.

The depot was listed on the National Register of Historic Places in 1985, and on the State Register of Historic Places in 1989.

References 

Railway stations on the National Register of Historic Places in Wisconsin
National Register of Historic Places in Madison, Wisconsin
Buildings and structures in Madison, Wisconsin
Madison
Former railway stations in Wisconsin
Charles Sumner Frost buildings
Railway stations in the United States opened in 1903
Railway stations closed in 1971
Transportation in Madison, Wisconsin
Repurposed railway stations in the United States